Claudio Sergio Rodríguez (born 17 January 1960) is an Argentine football manager and former player who played as a forward. He is the current manager of Colombian club Unión Magdalena.

Playing career
Born in Buenos Aires, Rodríguez played with Diego Maradona in the youth sides of Argentinos Juniors, named Los Cebollitas. He made his senior debut with San Lorenzo in 1980, before moving abroad in 1981 with Colombian side Unión Magdalena.

Rodríguez returned to his home country in 1984 with Estudiantes de Buenos Aires, and also played with Primera División sides Atlanta, Deportivo Maipu, Chacarita Juniors, Cipolletti and Talleres de Remedios de Escalada. He returned to Chacarita in 1992, before retiring two years later.

Managerial career
After retiring, Rodríguez started working in the youth sides of his last club Chacarita. He was also a youth manager of Fénix and Estudiantes de Buenos Aires, and later worked as an assistant at Midland.

On 2 April 2022, Rodríguez was announced as the assistant manager of another club he represented as a player, Unión Magdalena. Ten days later, he replaced Carlos Silva as manager of the first team.

Personal life
Rodríguez's father Perfecto was also a footballer and a forward.

References

External links

1960 births
Living people
Footballers from Buenos Aires
Argentine footballers
Argentine Primera División players
San Lorenzo de Almagro footballers
Argentinos Juniors footballers
Unión Magdalena footballers
Estudiantes de Buenos Aires footballers
Club Atlético Atlanta footballers
Deportivo Maipú players
Chacarita Juniors footballers
Club Cipolletti footballers
Talleres de Remedios de Escalada footballers
Argentine expatriate sportspeople in Colombia
Expatriate footballers in Colombia
Argentine football managers
Unión Magdalena managers
Argentine expatriate football managers
Expatriate football managers in Colombia